Theodore Malcolm "Ted" Nash (October 31, 1922 – May 12, 2011) was a jazz musician who played saxophone, flute, and clarinet. He was a session musician in Hollywood studios. His brother was trombonist Dick Nash and his nephew is saxophonist Ted Nash, who is a member of the Jazz at Lincoln Center Orchestra led by Wynton Marsalis.

Early life and career
Nash was born in the Boston suburb of Somerville, Massachusetts. His goal was to become a classical flutist until he began playing saxophone in his early teens. His professional career began when he went on the road with a succession of dance bands. In 1944, he became tenor saxophonist for the Les Brown big band. With Brown he played on the number one hits "Sentimental Journey" and "My Dreams Are Getting Better All the Time", both sung by Doris Day.

Hollywood studios
In the late 1940s, after getting married, Nash settled in the Los Angeles and became active as a session musician in the Hollywood movie and television studios. In 1956, he recorded with Paul Weston's orchestra the album Day by Day, with vocals by his former colleague and close friend, Doris Day.

He was the featured soloist on The Music from Peter Gunn soundtrack, performing the alto saxophone solo on the theme and on the second bridge of "Dreamsville". He was known for his mastery of the extreme altissimo register of the saxophone. He wrote Ted Nash's Studies in High Harmonics for Tenor and Alto Saxophone published in 1946.

Through the 1950s and 1960s, he worked as a sideman for June Christy, Nat King Cole, Bing Crosby, Billy Eckstine, Ella Fitzgerald, Frank Sinatra, and Nancy Wilson. During the 1970s, he worked with Judy Collins and Quincy Jones. He retired in the 1980s.

Discography

As leader
 The Brothers Nash (Liberty, 1955)
 Star Eyes, The Artistry of Ted Nash (Columbia, 1956)
 Peter Gunn (Crown, 1959)

As sideman
With Georgie Auld
In the Land of Hi-Fi with Georgie Auld and His Orchestra (EmArcy, 1955)

With Elmer Bernstein
 Sweet Smell of Success (Decca, 1957)
 Paris Swings (Capitol, 1960)

With Henry Mancini
 The Music from Peter Gunn (RCA Victor, 1959)
 More Music from Peter Gunn (RCA Victor, 1959)
 The Mancini Touch (RCA Victor, 1960)
 The Blues and the Beat (RCA Victor, 1960)
 Music from Mr. Lucky (RCA Victor, 1960)
 Combo! (RCA Victor, 1961)
 Breakfast at Tiffany's (RCA Victor, 1961)
 Hatari! (RCA Victor, 1962)
 Our Man in Hollywood (RCA Victor, 1963)
 Uniquely Mancini (RCA Victor, 1963)
 Mancini '67 (RCA Victor, 1967)

With Pete Rugolo
 Behind Brigitte Bardot (Warner Bros., 1960)

With Lalo Schifrin
 Che! (Tetragrammaton, 1969)

References

American jazz tenor saxophonists
American male saxophonists
1922 births
2011 deaths
American male jazz musicians
20th-century American saxophonists